The Divine Fury is a 2019 South Korean action horror film written and directed by Kim Joo-hwan. It stars Park Seo-joon, Ahn Sung-ki and Woo Do-hwan. The film was released on July 31, 2019.

Plot
The film tells the story of Yong-hoo (Park Seo-joon), a martial arts champion who gains divine powers to fight against a powerful evil force. After a tragic childhood, which involved the deaths of his parents, Yong-hoo has harbored deep resentment towards the Almighty. He uses this anger to become a successful MMA fighter. After a bout in the United States, he develops a stigmata, which forces him to seek the help of a Father Ahn (Ahn Sung-ki). The priest, who is an exorcist, sees potential in Yong-hoo after his wound defeated a demon. The two partner to battle demonic activity in Korea.

Cast
 Park Seo-joon as Yong-hoo
 Ahn Sung-ki as Father Ahn
 Woo Do-hwan as Ji-shin
 Park Ji-hyun as Soo-jin
 Jung Ji-hoon as Ho-seok
 Sim Hee-seop as Father Kim
 Lee Seol as Seol (cameo)
 Seo Jeong-yeon as Soo-jin's Mother
 Jo Eun-hyung as Hong-jin
 Park Jin-joo as Chinese restaurant delivery woman (cameo)
 Choi Woo-shik as Father Choi (cameo)
 Kim Si-eun as Nun Theresa (cameo)
 Lee Seung-hee as Possessed Man (cameo)
 Kim Seon-min as Angela
 Jung Eui-soon as Veronica
 Kim Bum-soo as Bum-soo
 Lee Chan-yoo as Yong-hoo (young)
 Ryu Kyung-soo as Doctor
 Rena Takeda as Michelle
 Eihi Shiina as Kim So-yeon
 Rima Matsuda as Yuri
 Grace Fulton as Ayano Sasaki

Production
The film began production on August 14, 2018. It reunites director Jason Kim and actor Park Seo-joon, after Midnight Runners.

Release
The film was released in cinemas in Australia and New Zealand on August 8, 2019, licensed by Purple Plan and distributed by Magnum Films, and in the United States and Canada on August 16, 2019, distributed by Well Go USA Entertainment.

References

External links
 
 
 
 
 
 
 
 
 

2019 films
2010s action horror films
South Korean action horror films
Lotte Entertainment films
2010s South Korean films